Platyphalla is a genus of moth in the family Gelechiidae. It contains the species Platyphalla ochrinotata, which is found in South Africa.

References

Endemic moths of South Africa
Gelechiinae